Dennis G. Shulman (born May 19, 1950) is a clinical psychologist, psychotherapist, author, teacher, public speaker, and ordained rabbi. In 2008, Shulman was the Democratic nominee for the United States House of Representatives in New Jersey's Fifth Congressional District.

Background
Born in Worcester, Massachusetts, Shulman was the second of three children of Israel and Helene Shulman.  His father was a pharmacist. Shulman began losing his sight at an early age, from a degenerative nerve disorder.

Education
By then totally blind, Shulman gained admission to Brandeis University. He graduated in the class of 1972 magna cum laude and Phi Beta Kappa.

Shulman next attended Harvard University where he began work toward a Ph.D. in Clinical Psychology and Public Practice. There, he won a Training Fellowship from the National Institute for Mental Health. In 1974, he married medical student Pamela Tropper. Also in that period, he began what has become an extended and diverse series of teaching positions, professional publications, postdoctoral studies and speaking engagements.

Career
In 1979 Shulman was licensed by New York  State and opened his practice in psychotherapy and psychoanalysis in New York City. Two years later, he moved to New Jersey, first Harrington Park and then Demarest, and received his license to practice in NJ in 1982. In 1990-91 he served as senior content designer and on-air lecturer in the nationally televised PBS series The World of Abnormal Psychology.

In 1997 he founded and directed the National Training Program in Contemporary Psychoanalysis at The National Institute for the Psychotherapies, at which he continues to teach and supervise. The National Training Program was Shulman’s and Dr. James Fosshage's creation. It is unique in the world of psychoanalytic training institutes, attracting distance learning students (psychiatrists, psychologists, and social workers) for full postgraduate psychotherapeutic/psychoanalytic training from throughout the United States, Canada, Asia, and Europe.

Meanwhile, in the mid-1990s Shulman began to explore the intersection between psychology and religion, discovering wisdom in the Bible that can inform contemporary life—“Taking the Bible not literally, but seriously” Shulman explains. Ultimately, Shulman took up study for the rabbinate. In 2003, Shulman received his rabbinic ordination—the same year that saw the publication of his book, The Genius of Genesis: A Psychoanalyst and Rabbi Examines the First Book of the Bible. Since December 2001, Rabbi Shulman has been the leader of a Jewish spiritual and study community in Bergen County, NJ.

Personal life
Shulman has lived in Demarest, New Jersey since 1984 with Dr. Pamela Tropper, his wife since 1974, an Attending Physician and Director of Global Women's Health at the Montefiore Medical Center in the Bronx. The couple has two daughters: Holly, who graduated from Vassar in 2005, is the National Press Secretary for the Democratic National Committee (DNC); and Juliana, who graduated from the University of Chicago in 2009, received her MPH from Johns Hopkins in 2015, and is studying law at Northeastern University.

Notes

References
 Monica Hesse.  "Rabbi on the Roof: N.J. Candidate Gets Taste of Washington."  Washington Post August 2, 2008, p. C1.
 Dianne Williamson.  "Time to Take a Stand, And Friends Join In."  Worcester (MA) Telegram & Gazette, December 4, 2007, p. B1.

External links
 
 Shulman for Congress official campaign website
 Campaign contributions at OpenSecrets.org
 Dennis Shulman professional website
 Curriculum Vitae
 Shulman, Dennis The Genius of Genesis
 Toobin, Jeffrey First Timer New Yorker, July 28, 2008
 Goodman, Adam A Rabbi in Congress? Time, July 18, 2008

Living people
1950 births
American Reform rabbis
Worcester Academy alumni
Brandeis University alumni
Harvard University alumni
People from Demarest, New Jersey
People from Harrington Park, New Jersey
American blind people
New Jersey Democrats